Paddy O'Keeffe (born 1864) was an Irish hurler who played as a half-back for the Cork senior team.

O'Keeffe played for Cork for just one season in the 1893 championship. It was a successful year as he won a set of All-Ireland and Munster medals.

At club level O'Keeffe enjoyed a lengthy career with Carrigtwohill.

O'Keeffe's son, John, also played with Cork and won an All-Ireland medal in 1919.  They were the first father and son combination to achieve the distinction of capturing All-Ireland winners' medals.

References

1864 births
Carrigtwohill hurlers
Cork inter-county hurlers
All-Ireland Senior Hurling Championship winners
Year of death missing